Cédrick Fiston (born 12 April 1981 in Guadeloupe) is a French-Guadeloupean footballer who plays striker.

Club career
Currently, he plays his football in his native Guadeloupe. Previously, he has played for Girondins de Bordeaux in France.

International career
He was a member of Guadeloupe's 2007 CONCACAF Gold Cup team.  He is recognized for having scored against Haiti in Guadeoupe's first group stage of the tournament.

External links
 French league stats – LFP

1981 births
Living people
French footballers
Guadeloupean footballers
Paris Saint-Germain F.C. players
FC Girondins de Bordeaux players
2007 CONCACAF Gold Cup players
Expatriate footballers in Portugal
Association football forwards
Guadeloupe international footballers